Caladenia barbarossa, commonly known as the common dragon orchid is a species of orchid endemic to the south-west of Western Australia. It can be distinguished by its distinctive labellum which is attractive to species of male thynnid wasps.

Description
The flowers are cream coloured to greenish-yellow with red markings. The petals also spread widely, are slightly shorter and narrower than the sepals and have their tips rolled inwards. The labellum resembles the body of a wingless female thynnid wasp and is stiffly hinged to the column.

Taxonomy and naming
Caladenia barbarossa was first described by Reichenbach in 1871 in Beitrage zur Systematischen Pflanzenkunde, from a specimen collected by James Drummond in 1843, near the Swan River. In a review of the genus Caladenia in 2004,  David Jones and Mark Clements proposed a name change to Drakonorchis barbarossa but the change has not been widely adopted.
The specific epithet was originally Barbarossa, indicating that the plant was named after Barbarossa, named thus for his red beard also.

Distribution and habitat
The common dragon orchid is widespread and common, between Bindoon, Ravensthorpe and Esperance in the Avon Wheatbelt, Esperance Plains, Jarrah Forest and Mallee biogeographic regions. It grows in sandy or clayey loams in moist situations in a wide range of habitats but especially in Casuarina thickets.

Ecology
Common dragon orchid is pollinated by male thynnid wasps when they try to copulate with the flower. A male Thynnoides bidens has been photographed on the labellum of a flower of this species.

Conservation
Caladenia barbarossa is classified as "Not Threatened" by the Western Australian Government Department of Parks and Wildlife.

References

External links
Caladenia barbarossa Occurrence data from Australasian Virtual Herbarium

barbarossa
Orchids of Western Australia
Endemic orchids of Australia
Plants described in 1871
Endemic flora of Western Australia
Taxa named by Heinrich Gustav Reichenbach